John Deacon (30 November 1962 – 8 August 2001) was a Motorcycle enduro racer. He had won several Paris Dakar Rally stages. He died as a result of head injuries sustained when his BMW bike flipped, 77 miles from the town of Palmyra in Syria during the seventh stage of the Masters Rally between France and Jordan. He was lying third in the event at the time.

He won the British Enduro four-stroke championship on ten occasions and won nine gold medals at the International Six Days Enduro event. He first contested the Paris-Dakar in 1997, becoming only the second British rider to finish the three-week, 7,000-mile event across Africa on a motorcycle. Within two years, and still funding his own participation, he claimed his country's best finish of sixth, beaten by five riders who enjoyed substantial financial backing.

The dangers of the sport were highlighted in the 2000 event, run in reverse from Senegal to Egypt, when he was offered a ride for the BMW Gauloises team but crashed on the fifth day, fracturing his pelvis and wrist, as well as dislocating his shoulder.

He is survived by his two children James and Zoe alongside his wife Tracey who continue to run his successful KTM dealer ship JDracing.

British motorcycle racers
Enduro riders
Motorcycle racers who died while racing
1962 births
2001 deaths
Sport deaths in Syria